David Antonio Llanos Almonacid (born 27 July 1989) is a Chilean footballer who plays for Unión San Felipe in the Primera B de Chile as a forward.

International career
In 2008, Llanos represented Chile U23 at the 2008 Inter Continental Cup in Malaysia, scoring a goal. The next year, along with Chile U21 he won the 2009 Toulon Tournament and represented Chile U20 at the 2009 South American U-20 Championship.

Honors

Club
Universidad Católica
 Primera División de Chile (3): 2016–C, 2016–A, 2018
 Supercopa de Chile (1): 2016

International
Chile U21
 Toulon Tournament (1): 2009

References

External links
 
 

1989 births
Living people
People from Talcahuano
Chilean footballers
Chile youth international footballers
Chile under-20 international footballers
C.D. Huachipato footballers
Deportes Concepción (Chile) footballers
Club Deportivo Palestino footballers
Rangers de Talca footballers
Club Deportivo Universidad Católica footballers
Unión Española footballers
Deportes La Serena footballers
Unión San Felipe footballers
Chilean Primera División players
Primera B de Chile players
Association football forwards